The University of Hradec Králové (in Czech Univerzita Hradec Králové, UHK; in Latin Universitas Reginaegradecensis) is a public university in Hradec Králové, Czech Republic, founded on 21 June 2000. It traces its roots back to 1959. The university has about 6,500 students, and the current rector is Kamil Kuča.

History

The university's precursor institution, the Institute of Education in Hradec Králové, was established in 1959, to train teachers for elementary level education, until then educated in high schools. In 1964, the institution developed into the Faculty of Education Hradec Králové. Training for all education levels began after a higher education reform in Czechoslovakia in 1976.

After the Velvet Revolution in 1989, some former staff from before 1968 returned to the faculty. In 1992 the Pedagogical University of Hradec Králové was officially established. On 15 February 1993, the university started expanding and a new Faculty of Management and Information Technologies was added, subsequently renamed the Faculty of Informatics and Management in 2000, the same year as the University of Hradec Králové was adopted as the official name.

On 1 September 2005, university added a third faculty, the Faculty of Arts, later known as the Philosophical Faculty. On 1 September 2010, after the transformation of the Faculty of Education, the Faculty of Science was formed.

Campus
The university currently consists of four faculties: the Faculty of Education, Faculty of Informatics and Management, Philosophical Faculty, and
Faculty of Science, all based on one campus known as Na Soutoku.

The university's Common Education Building was awarded by Czech architects as the "Building of Year" in 1998. The adjacent building of the Faculty of Informatics and Management was completed in 2008, costing 360 million CZK. Next to that is the Faculty of Science, built in 2016. Construction took 21 months and the cost was approximately 450 million CZK.

Since 2020, there is an ongoing reconstruction of the Philosophical Faculty building. The faculty is temporarily located on Vít Nejedlý Street during the work. Revitalisation of the Faculty of Education is scheduled to begin in 2021. The university also plans to build a facility specialised in natural and social sciences with laboratories, which will enclose the center of the campus.
 
UHK has two halls of residence, the Palach Halls of Residence (Palachovy koleje), and Vít Nejedlý Halls of Residence (Koleje Víta Nejedlého),, with a capacity of around 900 beds. The Palach Halls of Residence are under ongoing renovation.

Management
 Rector: Kamil Kuča
 Vice-Rector for Science and Creative Activities: Ondřej Krejcar
 Vice-Rector for Student Affairs and Cooperation with Practice: Petra Marešová
 Vice-Rector for International Affairs: Leona Stašová
 Vice-Rector for Strategy and Development: Michal Strobach

Symbols

The Rector's Sceptre, designed by Jan Hásek, is in the shape of a linden leaf, with a golden ball in the centre, and a silver lion at the top, symbolising the city of Hradec Králové. The sceptre was given to the university by the City of Hradec Králové.

The Statutory emblem consists of a central crowned Czech lion, looking heraldically left and holding in its forepaws a large letter "G". The figure also represents a part of the City of Hradec Králové emblem. In the circular inscription, the full title of the university is written in Latin.

References

External links
 University website
UHK forum 
 ESN Buddy System HK
Virtual Tour UHK

Hradec Kralove
Hradec Králové
Educational institutions established in 1964
Buildings and structures in Hradec Králové
1964 establishments in Czechoslovakia